
miR-208 is a family of microRNA precursors found in animals, including humans. The ~22 nucleotide mature miRNA sequence is excised from the precursor hairpin by the enzyme Dicer. This sequence then associates with RISC which effects RNA interference.

In humans, the gene for miR-208 is located in an intron of MYH7.

Function 
miR-208 has been deemed a "myomiR" as it is specifically expressed, or found at much higher levels, in cardiac tissue. Other myomiRs include miR-1 and miR-133. miR-208 is thought to be dysregulated in various cardiovascular diseases.

miR-208 functions in cardiomyocytes regulating the production of the myosin heavy chain during development. It also responds to stress and forms part of a hormonal signalling cascade in cardiac cells.

Applications
A preliminary study has shown a potential use in the prognosis of dilated cardiomyopathy. Another application has been suggested as using plasma concentration of miR-208 as a biomarker of damaged cardiac muscle cells.

References

Further reading 

 

MicroRNA
Biomarkers